Robert L. (Bob) Glass (born 1932) is an American software engineer and writer, known for his works on software engineering, especially on the measuring of the quality of software design and his studies of the state of the art of software engineering research.

Biography 
Glass held his first job in computing in 1954. He worked from 1954 to 1957 in the aerospace industry at North American Aviation, from 1957 to 1965 at Aerojet-General Corp. and from 1965 to 1982 at Boeing Company, where he built software tools used by applications specialists.

Between 1970 and 1972, Glass had worked on a tools-focused research grant at the University of Washington. From 1982 to 1987, he taught in the Software Engineering graduate program at Seattle University, and subsequently spent a year at the Software Engineering Institute. Early 2000s he has been visiting professor at the Linköping University in Sweden and at the Griffith University in Queensland, Australia. The Linkoping University awarded him a honorary PhD in 1995.

He is the emeritus editor-in-chief of the Journal of Systems and Software and also writes regular columns for Communications of the ACM and IEEE Software. In 1995 he was awarded an honorary Ph.D. from Linkoping University of Sweden, and in 1999 he was named a fellow of the Association for Computing Machinery (ACM) professional society. Using the pseudonym Miles Benson, Glass in the 1970's regularly wrote disguised stories of failed computing projects for industry publication Computerworld.

After 45 years in the field Glass described himself as "my head is in the academic area of computing, but my heart is in its practice."
Writing in IEEE Software in 2000, Glass criticized open-source software, predicting that it will not reach far, and "will be limited to one or a few cults emerging from a niche culture." Glass's basis for this bold prediction was that open-source software "goes against the grain of everything I know about the software field".

Publications 
Glass authored more than 200 papers and 25 books. A selection:
 1977. The universal elixir and other computing projects which failed 	
 1978. Tales of computing folk : hot dogs and mixed nuts
 1979. Software reliability guidebook  
 1979. Power of peonage
 1980. The second coming : more computing projects which failed. With "Sue deNim".
 1981. Software soliloquies
 1981. Software maintenance guidebook
 1983. Real-time software (edited by)
 1983. Computing catastrophes (compiled by)
 1988. Modern programming practices : a report from industry
 1988. Software communication skills
 1989. Software runaways
 1990. Measuring software design quality. With David N. Card.
 1991. Software conflict : essays on the art and science of software engineering  
 1992. Measuring and motivating maintenance programmers. With Jerome B. Landsbaum.
 1995. Software creativity 
 1996. ISO 9000 approach to building quality software. With Östen Oskarsson.
 1998. In the Beginning: Recollections of Software Pioneers. Editor. IEEE Computer Society Press, Los Alamitos, California.
 1999. Computing calamities : lessons learned from products, projects, and companies that failed.
 2001. ComputingFailure.com : war stories from the electronic revolution
 2003. Facts and fallacies of software engineering 
 2006. Software Conflict 2.0
 2006. Software Creativity 2.0
 2011. The Dark Side of Software Engineering: Evil on Computing Projects

Notes

References

External links 
 The Official Robert Glass Web Site

1932 births
Living people
American software engineers
Software engineering researchers
Seattle University faculty